Hitch-Hike, also known as Death Drive is an Italian crime film directed by Pasquale Festa Campanile. The film stars Franco Nero and Corinne Cléry as a couple in a troubled marriage, and David Hess as a fugitive who takes them hostage. The musical score was written by Ennio Morricone. The film is based on Peter Kane's novel The Violence and the Fury.

Plot
Walter Mancini (Nero), an alcoholic reporter, and his wife Eve (Cléry) are on a road trip with a trailer heading back to Los Angeles. Along the way, they pick up a hitch-hiker (Hess) who introduces himself as Adam Konitz. Konitz soon turns out to be a sadistic escapee from an institution for the criminally insane, and he is running from the law after robbing two million dollars with his partners. He takes the couple hostage and orders Eve to head to Mexico. They are soon stopped by two policemen and after Walter attempts to signal them by writing "SOS" on his matchbox, Konitz shoots them both.

While the three stop for the night, Konitz's two partners, whom he had betrayed to get all the loot for himself, shoot at Konitz and take control of the money and the car. They decide to keep the Mancinis alive until reaching the Mexican border. While driving, they are attacked by someone in a truck. The attacker turns out to be Konitz who kills his former associates and again takes the Mancinis hostage. After they reach a secluded place, Konitz strips and rapes Eve and forces Walter to watch the act. As Konitz gets ready to kill Walter, Eve shoots him with Walter's hunting rifle.

Despite Eve's opposition, Walter decides to keep the two million instead of going to the police. After the four young motorcyclists the couple met at a gas station pass them and pour oil on the road, the Mancinis' car goes off the road and crashes. One of the youngsters takes three hundred from Walter's pocket, but leaves the suitcase on the back seat untouched. The thieves then ride away. Eve is badly hurt and requests help from Walter. Walter brings Konitz's body from their trailer and plants it on the accident scene. He then tells the dying Eve that the thieves had only helped him. He had planned to stop after 15 to 20 miles, kill her and make it look like an accident. After lighting up a cigarette and setting the car and the trailer on fire, Walter starts walking and, hearing a car come by, thumbs a ride.

Cast

Franco Nero as Walter Mancini
Corinne Cléry (as Corinne Clery) as Eve Mancini
David Hess as Adam Konitz
Joshua Sinclair (as John Loffredo) as Oaks
Carlo Puri as Hawk
Ignazio Spalla (as Pedro Sanchez) as Mexican Way Station Clerk
Leonardo Scavino (as Leon Lenor) as Mendoza
Mónica Zanchi (as Monica Zanchi) as Campsite Lover
Benito Pacifico as Highway Patrolman #1
Angelo Ragusa as Highway Patrolman #2
Luigi Birri as Motorcycle Punk #2
Robert Sommer as Harry Stetson
Ann Ferguson as Lucy Stetson
Fausto Di Bella as Motorcycle Punk #1

Production
The film was based on The Violence and the Fury by Peter Kane.

In The Devil Thumbs a Ride, a short documentary on the film, Nero states that he became involved in the film because he already knew Campanile well, and Campanile had earlier stated his wish to work with him. Nero was in Germany shooting 21 Hours at Munich, in which Hess also had a small role, when Campanile called him and suggested starring in Autostop rosso sangue. Because Hess wanted to work in Italy, Nero suggested him as the second male lead. Hess had earlier played a similar role in The Last House on the Left.

Just a few days before the shooting of the film began, Nero broke his arm at the set of the Spaghetti Western Keoma while giving a misbehaving horse a punch. Nero approached Campanile with his problem and the script was quickly modified. In the final script, Nero's character hurts his hand in the beginning of the film and Cléry's character drives the car.

Because filming in the United States would have been too expensive, the film was shot in the mountains of the Gran Sasso, around the city of L'Aquila and Crognaleto in central Italy. The location resembled Northern California, and American-like gas stations and signs were also created.

Reception
In a contemporary review, the Monthly Film Bulletin, the film was condemned for being "dependent on heavy doses of violence to keep its predictable plot moving" and was "directed in a bland and featureless manner by Festa Campanile, and overtly portentous in its dialogue". The review concluded that it was "notable only for its extensive borrowings: Duel for the murderous truck that terrorises car and trailer on the mountain road; The Wild One and company for the motorcycle louts deliberately causing havoc on the highways; and numerous 'road' movies for its general format." Morricone's score was praised as an "attractive score, which makes fine use of a theme tune played on guitar, to its credit."

References

External links
 

1970s crime thriller films
Italian crime thriller films
1970s Italian-language films
English-language Italian films
1970s English-language films
Films directed by Pasquale Festa Campanile
Italian serial killer films
Films scored by Ennio Morricone
Films set in the United States
Films about hitchhiking
1970s Italian films